Agonum carbonarium is a species of ground beetle in the Platyninae subfamily that can be found in Albania, France, Greece, Italy, Portugal, Spain, Switzerland, and Near East. The species can also be found in Armenia and Turkey.

References

Beetles described in 1828
Beetles of Asia
Beetles of Europe
carbonarium